Encounter is a Canadian political affairs television program which aired on CBC Television from 1970 to 1974.

Premise
Canadian political figures were interviewed by a panel of journalists in each episode. In the early years of the program, the panel consisted of Ron Collister, Charles Lynch, and a visitor. In 1974, Collister and Lynch were replaced by Doug Collins and Elizabeth Gray. Guest politicians included Edgar Benson, Réal Caouette, Tommy Douglas, David Lewis, Peter Lougheed, Bryce Mackasey, Lester Pearson, Mitchell Sharp, Robert Stanfield and Pierre Trudeau.

Previously, the CBC conducted political interviews on Press Conference.

Scheduling
This half-hour program was broadcast from 1970 to 1974 as follows:

External links
 
 Encounter audio featuring Pierre Juneau from CBC Archives, rebroadcast 26 April 1970 on CBC Radio's Sunday Supplement

CBC Television original programming
1970 Canadian television series debuts
1974 Canadian television series endings
1970s Canadian television news shows